Richard B. Riddick, more commonly known as Riddick, is a fictional character and the antiheroic protagonist of the Chronicles of Riddick series, including the animated short movie Dark Fury and the video games Escape from Butcher Bay and Assault on Dark Athena. Actor Vin Diesel has played the title role in all of the Riddick-based films and video games thus far.

Within the canon of the series, Riddick is shown to have a vast number of skills, which include great mobility, stealth, killing abilities, survival in harsh conditions, prison-breaking, and piloting. Despite his criminal nature and background, he is sometimes shown to perform moral or even atypically heroic actions, usually against his own better judgment and survivalist nature.

Despite his Human origin in Pitch Black, in subsequent sequels his race was changed to Furyan, a warrior race of adapted humans obliterated by a military campaign that left his home planet of Furya desolate and is one of the last of his kind. One of his most defining features are his eyes, a characteristic inherent in a certain caste of his species (the Alpha-Furyans), although he implies in Pitch Black that they were "shined" by a back-alley surgical operation. This allows him to see clearly in the dark, but also makes him vulnerable to strong light; he wears tinted welding goggles for protection.

Riddick was once a mercenary, then part of a security force, and later a soldier.

Biography

Early life
Riddick was born on Furya. Before Riddick's birth, a Necromonger officer named Zhylaw (who would eventually become the Lord Marshall) consulted an Elemental seer, who told him that a Furyan male would be born that would be responsible for his downfall. This prompted Zhylaw to attack Furya and attempt to massacre all male children, going so far as to personally strangle newborn infants with their own umbilical cords. Riddick was among those presumably strangled, but he survived.

In later life, Riddick repressed his memories of Furya, including those of the massacre. He came to believe that when he was born, his mother attempted to strangle him and left him in a trash bin behind a liquor store. Despite this, he periodically received visions and messages from a Furyan survivor named Shirah, which he thought were signs of mental instability.  

Little is known about Riddick's childhood, save that he had no formal education and seemed to have been in trouble with the law from an early age. He claims to have been "educated" in the penal system.

Pitch Black

In the premiere installment in the franchise, Riddick is introduced as a notorious convict en route to a penal institution with his captor, a bounty hunter named William J. Johns. By impersonating a cop and traveling with a group of settlers aboard the nondescript transport cruiser Hunter Gratzner, Johns hopes to safely convey Riddick back to a prison colony and collect the outlaw's enormous bounty. However, the ship inadvertently passes through a comet's tail while on autopilot, forcing it to crash land on an unknown planet with three suns. Soon the survivors find themselves fighting for their lives against a predatory species called Bio-Raptors, and by the end of the film there are only three survivors: Riddick, a young girl called Jack, and Imam.

Dark Fury

Shortly after escaping the planet from Pitch Black, Riddick, Jack, and the Imam are picked up by a Mercenary spacecraft. Although Riddick attempts to conceal his identity from the mercenaries by impersonating William J. Johns (in Pitch Black) over the intercom, they quickly voiceprint and identify him. 

Captured by the mercenaries, the trio of survivors discover that their captors have unusual plans for Riddick. The ship's owner, Antonia Chillingsworth, collects criminals, whom she freezes and keeps as statues that are, in her view, art. Although the criminals are frozen, they are alive and conscious. To her Riddick is the ultimate "masterpiece" for her collection. Riddick, Jack, and Imam must fight their way through the army of human and alien creatures at her disposal or they will meet a fate crueler than death. Once they have killed most of the mercs on the ship, the trio takes one of Antonia's shuttles and heads for New Mecca (although at one point the navicomp shows a potential course for Furya), where Riddick leaves them before heading for the planet UV 6.

The Chronicles of Riddick

Five years later, Riddick has remained in hiding on an Arctic planet called U.V. for its harsh ultraviolet light. Meanwhile, Imam, learning that his own planet, Helion Prime, will be invaded by the twisted religious crusade of the Necromongers, recalls the story Riddick told him of his Furyan origins, and betrays Riddick's location to the Helion Prime leaders. Initially, Riddick is reluctant to become involved in the struggle between the Necromongers and the world they seek to conquer. But when Imam is killed, Riddick sets out on a mission to avenge him, eventually overthrowing the Lord Marshal (with help from Jack) and inheriting his office.

Riddick

Dissatisfied with his role as Lord Marshal, Riddick attempts to find Furya, but is instead abandoned on a desolate planet. After spending some time on this world, Riddick finds that he will soon be overtaken by a vicious storm that provides cover for countless predators.  Using the communication system from a mercenary outpost, Riddick lures two ships to the planet, intending to commandeer one of them; but his plan is complicated when he finds that one of the arriving mercenaries is the father of his old enemy, Johns the bounty hunter. Riddick uses the approaching storm to force the mercenaries to cooperate, but he is left surrounded by enemies and nearly killed. To his surprise, the elder Johns rescues him and allows him to leave. Riddick praises Johns for being a better man than his son.

Powers and abilities

Eyeshine

According to Riddick, while in Butcher Bay he received eye surgery (a "surgical shine job", as he calls it) from a doctor who gave him permanent night vision in exchange for "20 menthol KOOLs". The surgery made his eyes more sensitive to normal light, requiring him to wear welding goggles to protect them (although he has also been shown without the goggles in a regularly illuminated room).

In the flash movie on the Pitchblack.com website, Riddick gets the eye-shine to give him more of an advantage following an encounter with humanoids called "shiners". Referring to Riddick as "darkeye", they have had the same operation to see in the dark bowels of the Ursa Luna prison where the guards do not tend to go. The eye-shine surgery seems to be performed by a bovine veterinarian on board a prison facility where Riddick arrived only a few hours before and from which he is already in the process of escaping.  Riddick elects to have no anesthetic, despite the procedure involving cutting the cornea and drilling through the eye to inject a reflective substance behind the retina.  The cost quoted to Riddick is 1000 creds. Having no cash, Riddick offers down payment of a pack of Kool cigarettes which he earlier took from a guard. He also takes some welder's goggles from the facility.

The video game, The Chronicles of Riddick: Escape from Butcher Bay (which serves as a prequel to Pitch Black), clarifies that Riddick's eyeshine is more than just something he picked up in a prison. After helping a character called "Pope Joe" retrieve his "blessed voice box", a radio that picks up religious programming (including a Necromonger Talk Show), Riddick goes into a den to get stitches for an injury. After he is finished receiving stitches, Joe tells him how to escape, and, perhaps coincidentally, warns Riddick not to "trust [his] eyes"; at that moment, a ghostly voice informs Riddick that he has "been blind for far too long..." and that he is to receive a gift. It is at this moment that Riddick receives his eyeshine. The mysterious voice belongs to a character named "Shirah", who appears to serve as a sort of spiritual guide to Riddick, helping him awaken the Furyan abilities that lie dormant within him.  In the Chronicles of Riddick film, Jack/Kyra angrily tells Riddick that when she was sent to prison, she found out that it is impossible to find anyone who can perform a "surgical shine job" at any price and accuses him of lying about how he received his night vision.

Light amplification surgery, somewhat similar in effect to Riddick's eyeshine, has been patented in real life.

Wrath of the Furyans
Aside from helping Riddick unlock his eyeshine, the character Shirah also either allows or helps Riddick discover his ability to unleash a sort of energy wave. It is shown in the director's cut of The Chronicles of Riddick after she lays her hand on Riddick's chest, leaving a glowing blue handprint, and says, "this mark carries the anger of an entire race... but it's going to hurt". After either receiving a shot from Vaako's energy handgun or a fraction of a second before the discharge of said weapon, she immediately emits a large blast of blue energy from Riddick (or Riddick himself does so with her guidance), leaving the group of surrounding Necromongers dead. This ability is also displayed off screen in Escape from Butcher Bay.

Physical abilities
Aside from his more supernatural skills, Riddick is in superlative physical condition and is an exceptional fighter with or without the use of his eyes. Whether as a result of his Furyan heritage or simply training, Riddick is stronger, faster, more agile, tougher, more resistant to damage and injury, possessing more acute senses, immense stamina, and superior healing when compared to most humans; he is shown on more than one occasion dislocating his limbs for brief moments with only slight signs of discomfort, although he was in more obvious pain when his leg was broken in a fall, and had to use a heated rock to cauterize a wound when he was impaled in the chest by a creature's sharpened tooth. In general, Riddick possesses an abnormally high threshold of pain and psychologically channels what pain he does feel into anger. His ability to cope with toxins is also heightened; when a merc team was attempting to take him out with horse tranquilizers, it took four darts just to make Riddick stop running, and he still remained conscious until he was hit in the head. His ability to cope with pain, stress and situational panic is most likely the main reason behind his success, which combined with his sharp intelligence gives Riddick the ability to escape from any situation.

Riddick's abilities at hand-to-hand combat is a mix of Krav Maga, Hapkido, Eskrima, and Ninjutsu; he uses his formidable fighting skills while confronting one of the night-creatures of Pitch Black with only a shiv he had made, killing it with relative ease, as well as defeating one of the Lord Marshal's best Necromonger warriors in a matter of seconds in Chronicles.  Also, he was able to hold off the Lord Marshal and even injure him which the Lord Marshal admitted hadn't happened in a long time.  While Riddick was no match for him in speed, he was able to hold off the Lord Marshal for several minutes.

Intelligence
Despite his harsh upbringing and violent attitude, Riddick has been shown to have a certain knack for deduction, rapidly deducing what had happened to the original inhabitants of the mining base where he and the other crash survivors had been staying, as well as finding the creature's blind spot in Pitch Black and swiftly deducing what had caused the firefight between the Warden's and Toombs' men in The Chronicles of Riddick. He has also been described as having "a knack for escape", surviving not only the Lord Marshall's purge of the Furyans when he was an infant but subsequently escaping from various prisons over the course of his life. He is also able to quickly judge the quality of, and find even seemingly minor flaws in most weaponry, down to very specific details. In one case, Riddick concluded that the prized dagger of a Necromonger was "a half gram too heavy on the back end" after an inspection lasting all of a couple of seconds, although the tone of voice in which he delivered this appraisal suggested pre-fight bravado rather than abstract fact. His only weakness (other than light sensitivity, leaving him in pain when in daylight without his goggles), as stated in the Pitch Black DVD, is his soft spot for children and anyone who really grows on him (those people become his friends), which resulted in his capture by the bounty hunter Johns (Cole Hauser). While he may be a ruthless killer, when necessary, Riddick has never been shown to kill anyone who was not actively trying to kill him first and has been known to help people in need only if they don't slow him down or make him vulnerable. The only exception to this was when, in Pitch Black, he returned with Carolyn to help the others, after she pleaded with him. He also mentions on board the Dark Athena that people he helps often end up dead. In The Chronicles of Riddick, he considered it an insult, when he discovered the bounty placed on him was around a million of the currency for most planets, and when Toombs has a small crew to capture him (it was originally four crew members, then it was five).

In addition to raw analytical power, Riddick is generally an astute judge of character, especially in the dark side of human nature. A killer himself and resident of several maximum-security facilities, he is often able to predict an individual's negative impulses before they act on them. He has been known to be surprised on occasion, such as when Carolyn Fry in Pitch Black altruistically gave up a fast escape to save Jack and Imam from the alien creatures. Riddick was also surprised when he underestimated Jack's (Kyra's) affection toward him between Pitch Black and The Chronicles of Riddick, only learning of it after she had become a mercenary and resident of a maximum-security prison in order to see him once again. Otherwise, he correctly predicted which of the group in Pitch Black would turn on each other (in particular that Johns would try to double-cross Fry), and that the mercs and guards on Crematoria would turn on each other prior to his escape attempt. In Riddick, he appeared pleasantly surprised to learn that Johns' father was a better man than his son, complimenting Johns' nerve when he came back to help Riddick when he didn't have to.

Willpower
One major characteristic of Riddick is his indomitable will.  Despite finding himself in situations where the odds of survival and/or escape would seem insurmountable, Riddick always pushes forward and never gives up.  Faced with several creatures far more powerful than himself, or any human for that matter, he has shown himself to be capable of evading, killing, or even taming them. He has escaped out of prisons when most prisoners would resign themselves to captivity. When Riddick was mentally probed by the Quasi-Dead of the Necromongers, he not only resisted them, but also retaliated, the Quasi-Dead's containers actually exploding from the strain of trying to process Riddick. Given the Necromongers' apparent faith in and respect for the power of the Quasi-Dead, this is a very impressive feat. Perhaps even greater was his ability to resist the Lord Marshall's attempt to steal his soul.  The one time his will seemed to waver was when Kyra was killed, sacrificing herself to save him and help him defeat the Lord Marshal, and even then, he channeled his loss into new strength.

Weapons
Riddick is deadly with any weapon that he can get his hands on, but his weapon of choice is undoubtedly a knife. However, Riddick's most famous weapons are surely a pair of Ulak blades that he is seen using during his escape from Crematoria in The Chronicles of Riddick.

He has also been known to use anything from Necromonger gravity rifles, teacups and anything in between. Riddick can also kill efficiently without using a weapon.  In the second film, he used the knife he took from Irgun as his weapon during his fight with him and the Lord Marshall, killing both with it. The third film sees him predominately relying on a bone-sword he made from the remains of a creature he had killed.

Other appearances
Riddick's first appearance outside Pitch Black was a guest appearance and potential recruit in Fallout Tactics. He appears in the game during a random special encounter, aptly titled Pitch Black. Like his movie origin, Riddick is a stealth focused melee fighter with advanced hand-to-hand fighting skills and the ability to see in the dark.

Riddick has appeared as a playable character in the Xbox game Deathrow. He is one of the final players available on the Convicts team and has the highest amount of strength and aggression of all recruitable Convict players, although he has the equal-lowest teamplay rating in the game.

Behind the scenes Richard B. Riddick first appeared in Pitch Black: Slam City, a Shockwave prequel comic on the official Pitch Black website, one month before the release of the movie. In the film, and in all subsequent appearances the character has been portrayed by Vin Diesel.

In Jim and Ken Wheat's original script for Pitch Black, the Riddick character was a woman named Taras Krieg.

References

Film characters introduced in 2000
Fictional characters with superhuman senses
Fictional characters with superhuman strength
Fictional characters with accelerated healing
Fictional knife-fighters
Fictional mercenaries
Fictional murderers
Fictional outlaws
Fictional prison escapees
Fictional monster hunters
Fictional blind characters
Fictional hapkido practitioners
Fictional eskrimadors
Fictional Krav Maga practitioners
Fictional Ninjutsu practitioners
Fictional cryonically preserved characters
Action film characters
Science fiction film characters
The Chronicles of Riddick (franchise)
Fictional characters who can move at superhuman speeds
Fictional aviators
Video game protagonists